The 2017–18 French Guiana Régional 1 is the 57th season of the French Guiana Régional 1, the top tier of football in French Guiana. The season began on 14 September 2017 and ended on 16 June 2018.

Standings
Note: 4 points for a win, 2 points for a draw, 1 point for a defeat.

References

External links 
League Website

2017–18
2017–18 in Caribbean football leagues 
1